Harley Brinsfield hosted The Harley Show, Music out of Baltimore on WBAL and later on WFBR from about 1952 to sometime in the 1970s. With his second wife, Arlene Levy Brinsfield, he opened Harley Submarine Sandwich Shops, which, largely due to the publicity generated by his show, became one of the first and largest local fast food franchises pre-dating both McDonald's and Subway by many years.

In their heyday Harley sandwich shops dotted the commercial landscape. Harley sold his first sandwich at a stand he operated at Lexington Market in the 1940s. His first sandwich shop was at McMechen Street and Linden Avenue. Others followed at 5041 Reisterstown Road, 2235 Edmondson Avenue, 1001 East 25th Street, 6416 Holabird Avenue, 2047 East Monument Street and 3203 Greenmount Avenue. The chain was open all night. Some customers are alleged to have become addicted to Harley's submarines.

Harley himself is said to have been one of Baltimore's great original characters. He was born deep on the Eastern Shore, just outside the crossroads of Eldorado, in Dorchester County. He was an old friend of the late Millard Tawes, governor of Maryland from 1959 to 1967, who named him to the State Roads Commission. Harley never drove a car. He regularly walked down St. Paul Street from his home in the Marylander Apartments with thousands of dollars rolled up in his baggy pockets. He loved to talk.

Harley said he developed his treasured sandwich recipes when he served in the Merchant Marine. His submarine may have its origins in a New Orleans po boy sandwich. But it was not by sandwiches alone that he became so well known along the East Coast. He bought time on local radio stations at night (beginning in 1948 on WITH, then WSID, WCBM, WBAL from 1958 to 1974 and back to WITH in 1974). His "Harley Show" was (unconsciously) some of the greatest local radio in Baltimore.

Harley was USN Retired when he met and married Arlene Levy of San Francisco, California. A family story is that she hocked her engagement and wedding rings for sufficient cash to open the first Harley's. She became the bookkeeper for the chain, which eventually expanded to 15-20 restaurants throughout Maryland. Brinsfield also served as a commissioner of the Maryland State Roads Commission in the 1960s, representing the City of Baltimore.

Radio show
Harley purchased two hours in a block and had complete charge of the show. The show lead in with the theme Things Ain't What They Used To Be(played by a Duke Ellington small band with Johnny Hodges on the tenor sax) and closed with Sailing Down the Chesapeake Bay (Played by Bob Scobey's Frisco Band). He would showcase a particular performer and trace that performer's development throughout his show.  At various times, Harley used the Tishomingo Blues going to commercials or breaks.

Top jazz musicians when they played around Washington D.C. or Baltimore would show up on his show and the performer and Harley would reminisce about old times.

Legacy
Harley has the strange legacy of being perhaps the most obscure person in the history of jazz, while at the same time remembered and missed by more people than any other.

References
 Michael Olesker's Baltimore; Michael Olesker; The Johns Hopkins University Press
 Annual Report, Maryland State Roads Commission, 1965, which includes a photograph of Brinsfield.
 D. A. Levy, Researcher, Director of The Maritime Heritage Project (www.maritimeheritage.org), and niece of Arlene Levy Brinsfield.
The Baltimore Sun April 23, 1993|By JACQUES KELLY,  "Original Harley and his Harley Original"

External links
DCNYRadio (and TV) MEMORY BANK

American radio personalities
Radio personalities from Baltimore
Year of birth missing
Year of death missing